Demelza McCloud (née Fellowes; born 5 August 1980) is an Australian netball player. She was an Australian Institute of Sport scholarship holder. McCloud was selected in the Australian national team in 2004 and 2005. Domestically, she has played for the Adelaide Thunderbirds and Melbourne Kestrels in the Commonwealth Bank Trophy, and also played in New Zealand for the Otago Rebels in the 2007 National Bank Cup.

With the advent of the trans-Tasman ANZ Championship, McCloud was rostered with the Canterbury Tactix in New Zealand for the inaugural season in 2008. For the 2009 season, she signed with the Queensland Firebirds.

In 2009, McCloud was selected as part of the World 7 team where players from England, Jamaica, Samoa and Australia (not part of the Diamonds squad) formed a team to play against the Silver Ferns.

In 2010, McCloud decided to retire from netball. However, in the first round of the 2010 ANZ Championship, she was called to play for the Melbourne Vixens to replace Julie Corletto. In that match, she played all four quarters at Goal Keeper.

In late 2011, McCloud confirmed she would be returning to top level netball in 2012 for New Zealand franchise the Southern Steel in the ANZ Championship.

In 2013 she played again for the Queensland Firebirds and was named in the Australian squad at the end of the season to play a series against the Malawi Queens.

In 2015 she signed with the Tactix and plays with them currently.

References

1980 births
Living people
Australian Institute of Sport netball players
Adelaide Thunderbirds players
Melbourne Kestrels players
Southern Steel players
Queensland Firebirds players
Mainland Tactix players
ANZ Championship players
People from Wodonga
Australia international netball players
Netball players from Victoria (Australia)
Queensland Fusion players
Australian netball players
Australian Netball League players
Australia international Fast5 players
Australian expatriate netball people in New Zealand
Melbourne Vixens players
Otago Rebels players